A2Z Group is an engineering, procurement and construction company, headquartered in Gurgaon, India, in Haryana state. Its inception was in 2002, and  had more than 31,000 staff members. The company has clients in the retail, government, infraservices and renewable energy sectors.

The turnover for the financial year 2011 was Rs. 13.45 billion. 

The group's 5-year CAGR for financial year 2006 to 2011 was 64.5%.

History
A2Z was started by Mr. Amit Mittal in 2002. Initially the group began its operations in facility management, maintaining telecommunications towers for Vodafone India, reliance. Later, in 2008, it entered the engineering, procurement, and construction EPC (contract) business.  The EPC business expanded with the acquisition and merger of Sri Eswara Sai Construction Private Limited, a company that installed transmission lines, in January 2008. A2Z later transferred its FMS business to its wholly owned subsidiary, A2Z Infraservices in the same year pursuant to a court-approved scheme of demerger. In August 2009 A2Z acquired Imatek from the same FMS industry.

In May 2010, A2Z's EPC business signed a contract to purchase the entire business of Surendra Choudhary & Brothers, a partnership that constructed electrical substations and did railway electrification work.

Corporate leadership
Mr. Amit Mittal is the managing director

Group businesses
A2Z Group is dispersed across various locations in India and abroad, and has added many branches in the last 10 years, as listed below.

A2Z Infra Engineering Limited (Formerly Known as A2Z Maintenance & Engineering Services Limited)
This branch is an Electrical Business Group (EBG) that provides smart energy saving solutions and innovative ways of reducing transmission & distribution losses in building distribution & transmission infrastructure. The company has successfully executed challenging projects in difficult terrains and extreme weather conditions in the states of Jammu and Kashmir, Arunachal Pradesh, Himachal Pradesh, Jharkhand, Rajasthan, Orissa, Kerala and Bihar. Their quality management system in the EPC business (T&D) is ISO 9001:2008 certified by Moody International Certification, which is valid until February 2013

A2Z Infraservices Limited
This branch is an integrated solution provider for asset management services—from identification of an asset to its lifetime maintenance for MNCs, Indian companies and the large government sector. They have been involved in engineering maintenance (mechanical, plumbing, electrical, HVAC, DG Set), energy saving solutions, janitorial services, parking management, property lease management, telecommunications tower maintenance and security services to public and private sector clients. A2Z Infraservices was started in 2002, and started and generated a turnover of 29 Lakhs in the first year.

It is the first FMS ISO 9001 certified company, and is ESCO Certified. In 2005 it started in the railway business with South East Central Railway Zone in Bilaspur under the "Clean Train Station (CTS) Scheme". They provide services to the Indian Railways under the Clean Train Station ("CTS") scheme, the Intensive Rake Cleaning ("IRC") scheme and the On-Board Housekeeping Services ("OBHS") scheme in 11 out of 16 railway zones. It has recently acquired Mumbai based company CNCS.

A2Z has also acquired IL&FS Property Management & Services Ltd in a cash and stock deal. The deal to acquire IL&FS Property Management was done through its subsidiary A2Z Infraservices Ltd for a consideration of Rs 250 million. While Rs 70 million cash payment was made to IL&FS Infrastructure Equity Fund and IL&FS Employees Welfare Trust, the infrastructure major has also taken a 20% stake in A2Z Infraservices by way of stock swap. IL&FS Property Management had total revenues of Rs 900 million in FY10.

A2Z Infrastructure Limited
This branch has set up one of the largest single-location integrated resource recovery facilities (IRRF) in Asia, as well as setting up one of the first IRRF's with an ESCO focus. They have pioneered the concept of IRRF right from C&T (collection and transportation) to P&D (processing and disposal) by using all items that have not remained useful in their present form any longer. In India, so far, the projects are being done piecemeal. While C&T is done separately by different agencies, P&D is managed by the government through outsourcing model.

A2Z Powercom Limited
A2Z PowerCom focuses on waste-to-energy generation project conceptualisation, designing up until implementation and operation. 
 A2Z Powertech Limited
 A2Z Water Solutions Limited
 A2Z E-Waste Management Limited is an asset disposition provider with locations in Delhi, Mumbai, Bengaluru and Hyderabad.
 A2Z International
 A2Z Admire is a disaster emergency management company headed by Arun Goyal.
 A2Z Travel Solutions

Enziq Solutions
 Enziq is a Web, Multimedia & IT company headed by Mrinal V. Gokhale, William Emmanual and Mangesh V. Devikar.

References

Companies based in Haryana
Indian companies established in 2002
2002 establishments in Haryana
Companies established in 2002
Construction and civil engineering companies established in 2002
Companies listed on the National Stock Exchange of India
Companies listed on the Bombay Stock Exchange